Defensor Sporting Club is a sports club based in Montevideo, Uruguay. Founded in 1913, Defensor has several sports sections, with football and basketball being the most important and the ones in which the club has achieved significant achievements in Uruguay and internationally.

It is the third most highest winning club in Uruguay, with 25 official titles, only surpassed by Peñarol and Club Nacional de Football. The club's best performance at the international stage was in 2014, when they reached the semi-finals of the Copa Libertadores, eventually losing to Club Nacional 2-1 on aggregate. They have won the Uruguayan Championship four times: in 1976, 1987, 1991, and 2007-08. Their 1976 title win was especially notable in Uruguay's football history as it ended 44 years of dominance by Nacional and Peñarol.

History
Founded on March 15, 1913 as Club Atlético Defensor, the name of the club was changed in 1989 to Defensor Sporting Club after a merger with Sporting Club Uruguay. They played in the first professional league season in Uruguay, the 1932 Uruguayan Primera División

Defensor has won many qualifying tournaments (Pre-Liguilla) to the Copa Libertadores and has represented Uruguay on numerous occasions internationally. Regarded as one of the teams that creates and develops many players in Uruguay that become successful players worldwide, It is the first club of numerous players like Jorge "Polilla" da Silva, Sergio "Manteca" Martínez, Sebastián Abreu, Andrés Fleurquin, Marcelo Tejera, Darío Silva, Gonzalo Vargas, Diego "Ruso" Pérez, Nicolás Olivera, Martín Cáceres, Maxi Pereira, Álvaro González, and Tabaré Viúdez.

Legendary coach Prof. José Ricardo de León brought Defensor to the national championship in 1976 and originated a football (fútbol) school of thought, consistently criticized as ultra defensive, that is still present nowadays in several teams and coaches.

In September 2007, the club was considered the World's Club Team of the Month by the IFFHS.

Defensor Sporting's most famous supporter is singer/composer Jaime Roos.

Stadium

Defensor plays its home games at its own stadium called Estadio Luis Franzini which has a capacity for 18,000 spectators. The stadium was opened on 31 December 1963, and is located in Parque Rodó, Montevideo.

Rivalries 
Defensor Sporting has had a rivalry with Danubio in recent years, because of the two clubs being the next biggest clubs in Uruguay after the historical two: Peñarol and Nacional. Matches between them are called the "Clásico de los medianos" (Spanish for Classic of the Mediums).

Honours

Domestic
Uruguayan Primera División: 4
 1976, 1987, 1991, 2008
Segunda División Uruguay: 2
 1950, 1965
Copa AUF Uruguay: 1
 2022

Other Official Domestic Honours
Apertura: 4
 1994, 2007, 2010, 2017
Clausura: 4
 1997, 2009, 2012, 2013
Liguilla Pre Libertadores: 8
1976, 1979, 1981, 1989, 1991, 1995, 2000, 2006
Copa Montevideana: 8
1976, 1979, 1982, 1987, 1991, 1994, 1995, 1997
Campeonato Nacional General Artigas: 1
1960
Cuadrangular: 1
1957
Torneo Honor: 1
1947

Performance in CONMEBOL competitions
Copa Libertadores: 16 appearances
1977: Group Stage
1980: Group Stage
1982: Group Stage
1990: Round of 16
1992: Round of 16
1994: Round of 16
1996: Round of 16
2001: Group Stage
2006: First Round
2007: Quarter-finals
2009: Quarter-finals
2012: Group Stage
2013: First Stage
2014: Semi-finals
2018: Group Stage
2019: Third Qualifying Stage

U-20 Copa Libertadores: 1 appearance
2012: Runner-up

Copa Sudamericana: 7 appearances
2005: Second Round
2007: Quarter-finals
2008: Round of 16
2010: Round of 16
2015: Quarter-finals
2017: First Stage
2018: Second Stage

Copa CONMEBOL: 2 appearances
1995: First Round
1997: First Round

Kit evolution

Current squad

Out on loan

Notable former players

  Diego Jaume

Notable coaches
 Hugo Bagnulo (1952 – 1957), (1960 – 1961)
 Gregorio Pérez (1983 – 1984)
 Juan Ahuntchaín (1996)
 Ricardo Ortiz (1996 – 1997)
 Juan Tejera (2004 – 2005)
 Jorge da Silva (2005 – 2009)
 Gustavo Ferrín (2009 – 2010)
 Pablo Repetto (2010 – 2011)
 Gustavo Díaz (2011 – 2012)
 Tabaré Silva (2012 – 2013)
 Fernando Curutchet (2013 – 2014)
 Mauricio Larriera (2015 – 2016)
 Eduardo Acevedo (2016 – 2018)

References

External links

 

1913 establishments in Uruguay
Association football clubs established in 1913
 
Football clubs in Uruguay